Burckella is a genus of plants in the family Sapotaceae, described as a genus in 1890. It is named for the Dutch botanist William Burck.

Burckella is native to New Guinea, the Indonesian province of Maluku, and the islands of Papuasia east of New Guinea.

Species

References

 
Sapotaceae genera
Taxonomy articles created by Polbot